Coolbits was a Windows registry hack for Nvidia graphics cards Windows drivers, that allows tweaking features via the Nvidia driver control panel (including overclocking).
There is also a Coolbits 2.0, with extra features.
These features provided by Coolbits are considered expert-only and thus the reason they are normally hidden in the control panel.

Below is the main Coolbits activation entry in the registry:
 [HKEY_LOCAL_MACHINE\SOFTWARE\NVIDIA Corporation\Global\NvTweak]
 "CoolBits"=dword:00000003 

It is also available on Unix-like systems running the X Window System by setting the "Coolbits" option to "5" in the configuration file. Using "28" instead of "5" will enable additional overclocking features.

References

Graphics cards
Nvidia